Pok Wai is a walled village in the San Tin area of Yuen Long District, Hong Kong.

Administration
Pok Wai is a recognized village under the New Territories Small House Policy.

History
The village was erected by Man Sau-fuk around a century ago.

At the time of the 1911 census, the population of Pok Wai was 225. The number of males was 100.

Features
The village features a central axis and seven rows of village houses. The entrance gate and the enclosing walls have been demolished. A shrine is located at the back row of the village houses, facing the entry vertical lane of the village. Its altar houses 13 deities for worship, including Kwun Yam, Tin Hau, Man Cheong and Yeung Hau.

A post World War II pillboxes and trenches system is located in the vicinity of Pok Wai. They are believed to have been built as part of the British defense of Kai Kung Leng, and protecting Shek Kong Airfield.

See also
 Walled villages of Hong Kong

References

Further reading

External links
 Delineation of area of existing village Pok Wai (San Tin) for election of resident representative (2019 to 2022)
 Antiquities Advisory Board. Pictures of the Shrine at No. 106 Pok Wai

Walled villages of Hong Kong
San Tin
Villages in Yuen Long District, Hong Kong